Tenuisis is a genus of deep-sea bamboo coral in the family Isididae. It is monotypic with a single species, Tenuisis microspiculata.

References

Isididae
Octocorallia genera